The following is an incomplete list of Indian classical music festivals, which encapsulates music festivals focused on Indian classical music. The origins of Indian classical music can be found in the Vedas, which are the oldest scriptures in the Hindu tradition dating back to 1500 BC. Indian classical music has also been significantly influenced by, or syncretised with, Indian folk music. There are two divisions in Indian classical music. Hindustani music is mainly found in North India. Carnatic music, from South India, tends to be more rhythmically intensive and structured than Hindustani music. While some festivals such as the Carnatic event Tyagaraja Aradhana (founded in the 1840s) continue to focus on traditional Carnatic classical music, an emergent trend of the past few decades has been that of fusion music, where genres such as khyal and western music are intermixed to appeal to a wider audience.

Festivals

Carnatic

Hindustani

Odissi

See also

Indian classical music

References

External links

World music festivals
Festivals
Festivals
Festivals
Lists of music festivals in Asia
Lists of religious festivals
Lists of religious music festivals
Lists of folk festivals
Lists of world music festivals
Festivals of Indian culture
 
Music